The 2015–16 season was Notts County's 153rd season in their history and their first season back in League Two since being relegated from League One the previous season. Along with League Two, the club will also compete in the FA Cup, League Cup and League Trophy. The season covers the period from 1 July 2015 to 30 June 2016.

Transfers

Transfers in

Transfers out

Loans in

Loans out

Competitions

Pre-season friendlies
On 20 May 2015, Notts County announced their pre-season schedule which included five friendly matches. On 4 June 2015 a friendly against Arnold Town was announced. On 24 June 2015, Notts County announced a home friendly against Scunthorpe United.

Result by round

League Two

League table

Matches
On 17 June 2015, the fixtures for the forthcoming season were announced.

The Carlisle game was relocated due to Storm Desmond
The Hartlepool game on 16 February was rearranged from Boxing day

League Cup
On 16 June 2015, the first round draw was made, Notts County were drawn away against Huddersfield Town. In the second round, Notts County were drawn away to Aston Villa.

FA Cup

Football League Trophy
On 8 August 2015, live on Soccer AM the draw for the first round of the Football League Trophy was drawn by Toni Duggan and Alex Scott. In the draw for the second round, held on 5 September 2015, Notts County were drawn away at Sheffield United.

References

Notts County
Notts County F.C. seasons